Valestrand is a former municipality in the old Hordaland county, Norway.  The  municipality existed from 1868 until its dissolution in 1964. It was located on a peninsula on the southern shore of the Bømlafjorden inside the present-day municipality of Sveio.  The administrative centre of Valestrand was the village of Valevåg. The two churches in Valestrand were Valen Chapel and Valestrand Church.

History
The municipality of Valestrand was established on 15 May 1868 when the southern district of the large municipality of Stord (south of the Bømlafjorden) was separated from the rest of Stord to become its own municipality.  Initially, Valestrand had a population of 900.  On 1 April 1870, the Øklandsgrend area (population: 247) of the neighboring municipality of Finnås was transferred to Valestrand.  On 1 January 1964, a major municipal merger took place as a result of the Schei Committee. The municipalities of Sveio (population: 1,697) and Valestrand (population: 1,216) were merged with the western part of the municipality of Vikebygd (population: 471) and a small portion of the northern part of the municipality of Skjold (population: 24), both located north and west of the Ålfjorden.  The new municipality was called Sveio.  The small portion from Skjold municipality was in Rogaland county, and after the merger it switched to Hordaland county.

Municipal council
The municipal council  of Valestrand was made up of 13 representatives that were elected to four-year terms.  The party breakdown of the final municipal council was as follows:

Notable people
 Einar Økland – poet, playwright, essayist and children's writer. 
 Fartein Valen – composer and music theorist.
 Agnes Ravatn – author, columnist and journalist.

See also
List of former municipalities of Norway

References

Sveio
Former municipalities of Norway
1868 establishments in Norway
1964 disestablishments in Norway